The Colleges and Universities Sports Association is an athletic association composed of colleges and universities in the Philippines. It was established in 1994. The league is currently inactive.

Member schools

Basketball Champions
2004-2005 - PMI Mariners
2005-2006 -
2006-2007 - PMI Admirals
2007-2008 -
2008-2009 - MLQU Stallions

External links
Gameface.ph: Colleges and Universities Sports Association

Student sport in the Philippines